The 2005 Arizona Diamondbacks baseball team looked to improve on their 51–111 record from 2004. They looked to contend in what was once again a weak National League West Division. They finished the season with a record of 77–85, good for second place in the division.

Offseason
 December 11, 2004: Russ Ortiz was signed as a free agent with the Arizona Diamondbacks.
 December 21, 2004: Craig Counsell was signed as a free agent with the Arizona Diamondbacks.
 January 11, 2005: Shawn Green was traded by the Los Angeles Dodgers to the Arizona Diamondbacks for Dioner Navarro, Beltrán Pérez, Danny Muegge (minors), and William Juarez (minors).
 January 11, 2005: Randy Johnson was traded by the Arizona Diamondbacks to the New York Yankees for Javier Vázquez, Brad Halsey, Dioner Navarro, and cash.

Regular season

Notable Transactions
 July 31, 2005: Buddy Groom was sent to the Arizona Diamondbacks by the New York Yankees as part of a conditional deal.

Season standings

National League West

Record vs. opponents

Roster

Player stats

Batting

Starters by position
Note: Pos = Position; G = Games played; AB = At bats; H = Hits; Avg. = Batting average; HR = Home runs; RBI = Runs batted in

Other batters
Note: G = Games played; AB = At bats; H = Hits; Avg. = Batting average; HR = Home runs; RBI = Runs batted in

Pitching

Starting pitchers
Note: G = Games pitched; IP = Innings pitched; W = Wins; L = Losses; ERA = Earned run average; SO = Strikeouts

Other pitchers
Note: G = Games pitched; IP = Innings pitched; W = Wins; L = Losses; ERA = Earned run average; SO = Strikeouts

Relief pitchers
Note: G = Games pitched; W = Wins; L = Losses; SV = Saves; ERA = Earned run average; SO = Strikeouts

Minor League

LEAGUE CHAMPIONS: South Bend

References

External links
 Arizona Diamondbacks official web site 
2005 Arizona Diamondbacks at Baseball Reference
 2005 Arizona Diamondbacks team page at www.baseball-almanac.com

Arizona Diamondbacks seasons
Arizona Diamondbacks
Arizonia